The 2018–19 snooker season was a series of professional snooker tournaments played between 10 May 2018 and 23 June 2019. The season was made up of ranking tournaments, non-ranking tournaments and variant tournaments. In total, 54 events were competed in the 2018–19 season, beginning with the pro–am 2018 Vienna Open, and ending with the 2019 World Snooker Championship.

To be eligible to play in most tournaments, players had to have qualified to play on the World Snooker Tour, however, some wildcard former professional, and amateur players were eligible in certain competitions. The season also saw four events strictly for over 40s, as a part of the World Seniors Tour.

Ronnie O'Sullivan, Neil Robertson and Judd Trump each won three ranking events with Mark Allen, Stuart Bingham and Kyren Wilson each winning twice. Robertson reached six ranking event finals during the season.

Players

The Main Tour consists of 128 professional players for the 2018/2019 season. The top 64 players from the prize money rankings after the 2018 World Championship and the 34 players earning a two-year card the previous year (excluding Lyu Haotian, who already climbed into the top 64 of the world rankings following the first year of his two-year tour card) automatically qualified for the season. Next, eight places were allocated from the top 8 on the One Year Ranking List, who had not already qualified for the Main Tour. Another two players came from the EBSA Qualifying Tour Play-Offs, two players came from the CBSA China Tour and a further 12 places were available through the Q School (four Event 1 winners, four Event 2 winners, and four Event 3 winners). The six remaining entries on to the tour were allocated from the international amateur events.

Due to the disputes between the IBSF and the WPBSA, the WPBSA decided that the winners of the tournaments organised by the IBSF or any continental confederations which were not affiliated to the World Snooker Federation would not be awarded tour cards. The only exception was the IBSF World Under-21 Snooker Championship, which had been concluded before the decision was made.

New professional players
All players listed below received a tour card for two seasons.

WSF Championship winner:  Luo Honghao
WSF Championship runner-up:  Adam Stefanow
IBSF World Under-21 Snooker Championship winner:  Fan Zhengyi
EBSA European Snooker Championships winner:  Harvey Chandler

ABSF African Championships winner:  Mohamed Ibrahim (withdrew)

One Year Ranking List 

EBSA Qualifying Tour Play-Offs

CBSA China Tour

Q School
Event 1

Event 2

Event 3

Invitational Tour Card

Calendar
The following tables outline the dates and results of all events of the World Snooker Tour, World Women's Snooker, the World Seniors Tour, the Challenge Tour, and other events.

World Snooker Tour

World Women's Snooker

World Seniors Tour

Challenge Tour

Other events

Points distribution 
2018/2019 points distribution for World Snooker Tour ranking events:

Notes

References

External links 
 Snooker season 2018/2019 at Snooker.org

Seasons in snooker
Season 2018
Season 2019